SpareBank 1 Østlandet is the fourth largest Norwegian savings bank and is based in eastern Norway. The bank´s major market is in the counties of Innlandet, Oslo and Viken. The company head office is situated in Hamar, and the bank has 37 branches in its market area. SpareBank 1 Østlandet is part of the SpareBank 1 alliance.

SpareBank 1 Østlandet´s equity certificate was listed at Oslo Stock Exchange at the 13th of June 2017 with the ticker SPOL.

SpareBank 1 Østlandet was the first Norwegian bank to share its profit by paying customer dividends.
 
Member of the alliance SpareBank 1 holding 12,4 % ownership of Sparebank 1 Gruppen AS, 2019.

Subsidiaries:
 Estate agency (EiendomsMegler 1 Innlandet AS)
 Estate agency (EiendomsMegler 1 Oslo Akershus AS)
 Leasing and asset financing (SpareBank 1 Finans Østlandet AS)
 Accounting and consultancy chain (TheVIT AS)

History
The bank has its roots back to 1845, and today's modern bank is a result of several mergers of local savings banks through the history. The last found place in 2017 when Bank 1 Oslo Akershus AS was merged in.

External links

 Corporate web site

Banks of Norway
Companies based in Hamar